Ashok Kumar Walia (8 December 1948 – 22 April 2021) was an Indian politician and was member of the 1st, 2nd, 3rd and 4th Legislative Assemblies of Delhi. He was a member of the Indian National Congress party and represented Laxmi Nagar (Assembly constituency) of Delhi in his 4th term. From 1st to 3rd term, he represented Geeta Colony, which after Delimitation of Parliamentary and Assembly Constituencies Order, 2008 ceased to exist as an assembly constituency.

Early life and education
Walia was born in New Delhi into a Punjabi Hindu family. He received a MBBS degree from MGM Medical College in Indore in 1972 and was a physician by profession.

Political career
Walia was MLA for four consecutive terms. He has served as a State Minister in Sheila Dikshit's government and held Health, Urban Development, Land & Building portfolios. He was also the Chairman of Trans Yamuna Area Development Board.

Posts held

Death
Senior Leader Ashok Kumar Walia died due to COVID-19  in the Delhi Apollo Hospital.

See also

 First Legislative Assembly of Delhi
 Second Legislative Assembly of Delhi
 Third Legislative Assembly of Delhi
 Fourth Legislative Assembly of Delhi
Delhi Legislative Assembly
Government of India
Politics of India
Indian National Congress

References 

Delhi politicians
1948 births
2021 deaths
Indian National Congress (Organisation) politicians
Punjabi people
Punjabi Hindus
People from New Delhi
People from East Delhi district
Deaths from the COVID-19 pandemic in India
Ahluwalia
Delhi MLAs 1993–1998
Delhi MLAs 1998–2003
Delhi MLAs 2003–2008
Delhi MLAs 2008–2013